Zoe Gail (20 February 1920 – 20 February 2020) was a South African-born British-American actress.

Early life 

Gail was born Zoe Margaret Stapelton in Cape Town, Cape Province, Union of South Africa. She was an actress known for Tonight at the London Palladium (1955), No Orchids for Miss Blandish (1948), Lady Luck (1948) and Here's Looking at You. Gail was also known for her comedic abilities. She was married to Hubert Gregg with whom she had one child, Stacey Gregg, and also married to Bert Bernard. Gail was chosen to switch on the lights at the West End of London in 1949 nearly a decade after they were turned off at the outbreak of World War II. She stood in a spotlight on the balcony of the Criterion Restaurant at Piccadilly Circus, dressed in black top hat, white tie and tails, she sang her hit song I’m Going to Get Lit Up When the Lights Go Up in London. Then she said "Abracadabra, hey Presto" and switched on the lights. She then quickly tossed her top hat into a crowd of ten thousand people. But Zoe had not gotten universal admiration when she first sang the song in Strike a New Note at the Prince of Wales Theatre in 1943. J B Priestley  disapproved of her “strange, hermaphroditic garb”.

Death 

On 20 February 2020, Zoe Gail died in Las Vegas, Nevada, United States on her 100th birthday.

References

External links

1920 births
2020 deaths
20th-century American actresses
American centenarians
South African centenarians
South African emigrants to the United States
Women centenarians
21st-century American women